William Joyce (1906–1946) was a Second World War propagandist, nicknamed "Lord Haw-Haw".

William Joyce may also refer to:

William Joyce (actor) (1930–1988), American actor
William Joyce (writer) (born 1959), American author, illustrator and filmmaker
Willie Joyce, American boxer and the 1936 National AAU Bantamweight champion
 Willie Joyce (Gaelic footballer) (born 1950), Irish former Gaelic footballer
Bill Joyce (1877–?), Scottish association footballer
Bill Joyce (baseball) (1865–1941), American professional baseball player
 Bill Joyece, quarterback for the Detroit Heralds in 1920